Bratislav Živković (born 28 November 1970) is a Serbian football manager and former player.

Club career
During his career that spanned from the late 1980s to the mid 2000s, Živković played for Dubočica, Vojvodina, Red Star Belgrade, Sampdoria, and Obilić.

International career
At international level, Živković was capped six times by FR Yugoslavia between 1996 and 1998.

Post-playing career
In July 2007, Živković was named the president of his hometown club Dubočica.

In March 2015, Živković was appointed manager of Voždovac.

Honours
Red Star Belgrade
 First League of FR Yugoslavia: 1994–95
 FR Yugoslavia Cup: 1994–95, 1995–96, 1996–97

References

External links
 
 
 

Association football defenders
Expatriate footballers in Italy
First League of Serbia and Montenegro players
FK Dubočica players
FK Inđija managers
FK Obilić players
FK Vojvodina players
FK Voždovac managers
Guangzhou City F.C. non-playing staff
Red Star Belgrade footballers
Red Star Belgrade non-playing staff
Serbia and Montenegro expatriate footballers
Serbia and Montenegro expatriate sportspeople in Italy
Serbia and Montenegro footballers
Serbia and Montenegro international footballers
Serbian football managers
Serbian SuperLiga managers
Serie A players
Serie B players
Sportspeople from Leskovac
U.C. Sampdoria players
Yugoslav First League players
Yugoslav footballers
1970 births
Living people